Dysschema boisduvalii is a moth of the family Erebidae first described by Jan van der Hoeven in 1840. It is found in Paraguay, Colombia, Brazil and Argentina.

Adults are sexually dimorphic. Males are white with four blackish dots on the forewings, while females are mostly blackish with the dots on the abdomen reduced.

The larvae feed on the leaves of Vernonia species.

References

Taxa named by Jan van der Hoeven
Moths described in 1840
Dysschema
Arctiinae of South America